Collier Island is an island located by Kirkwood Center, New York, on the Susquehanna River.

References

Landforms of Broome County, New York
Islands of the Susquehanna River in New York (state)
Islands of New York (state)